Why Raeliana Ended Up at the Duke's Mansion is a South Korean web novel written by Milcha. It has been serialized in Kakao's digital comic and fiction platform KakaoPage since September 19, 2016. A webtoon adaptation was first serialized in KakaoPage on September 3, 2017, and is illustrated by Whale. An anime television series adaptation by Typhoon Graphics is set to premiere in April 10, 2023.

Characters
 /  / Park Eun-ha

Media

Novel
Written by Milcha, the novel began serialization on Kakao's digital comic and fiction platform KakaoPage on September 19, 2016. It composed of 159 chapters and collected in 3 volumes plus 1 side story book.

A digital English translation of the novel was published exclusively in the Tappytoon app, under the title The Reason Why Raeliana Ended up at the Duke's Mansion.

Volume list

Manhwa
A manhwa adaptation, illustrated by Whale, was serialized on KakaoPage on September 3, 2017 to March 22, 2021. It was collected in seven volumes by D&C Media as of July 2022.

The manhwa is published digitally in English by Tappytoon and in print in Japan by Kadokawa Shoten. In October 2021, Yen Press announced that they licensed the manhwa for English publication.

Volume list

Video game
A romance video game adaptation was developed by SHIFT UP Corp. and released on May 27, 2021. It is set to receive English and Japanese translations.

Anime
An anime television series adaptation was announced on July 4, 2022. It is produced by Typhoon Graphics and directed by Junichi Yamamoto, with scripts written by Mitsutaka Hirota, character designs handled by Haruna Hashimoto, and music composed by Keiji Inai. The series is set to premiere on April 10, 2023, on AT-X and other networks. The opening theme song is "Survive" by MindaRyn, while the ending theme song is "Always and Forever" by Serra. Crunchyroll licensed the series outside of Asia.

References

External links
  at KakaoPage 
  at KakaoPage 
  
 

2017 webtoon debuts
2023 anime television series debuts
21st-century South Korean novels
Anime based on manhwa
Crunchyroll anime
Fantasy webtoons
Fiction about reincarnation
Isekai comics
Kadokawa Shoten manga
Manhwa titles
Romance webtoons
South Korean webtoons
Typhoon Graphics
Upcoming anime television series
Yen Press titles